The Thousand Islands International Bridge is an American-maintained international bridge system over the Saint Lawrence River connecting northern New York in the United States with southeastern Ontario in Canada. Constructed in 1937, with additions in 1959, the bridges span the Canada–US border in the middle of the Thousand Islands region. All bridges in the system carry two lanes of traffic, one in each direction, with pedestrian sidewalks.

Structure
The Thousand Islands International Bridge system is a series of five bridges spanning the St. Lawrence River. From south to north, they are:
 American mainland to Wellesley Island (main span)
 Wellesley Island to Hill Island (international crossing)
 Hill Island to Constance Island
 Constance Island to Georgina Island
 Georgina Island to Canadian mainland

The bridges's southern end connects with Interstate 81, and the northern end with Highway 401 via Highway 137. There is also an interchange with the Thousand Islands Parkway on the Ontario side.

The actual international border bridge crossing is a set of two parallel  bridges between Wellesley Island in the United States and Hill Island in Canada.

Administration
The bridge system is administered by the Thousand Islands Bridge Authority, a New York State public benefit corporation, whose seven board members (Four Americans and three Canadians) are appointed by the Jefferson County Board of Legislators. The Authority also maintains and administers Boldt Castle.

Tolls are paid only by cash, E-ZPass, or Commuter Discount Fare Trip Tags, which are prepaid for either 16 trips (US$20.00) or 72 trips (US$32.00). The Bridge Authority is a member of the multi-state E-ZPass consortium, and introduced electronic toll collection in June 2019. No other ETC transponders are currently offered or accepted, although the Bridge Authority offers sales of transponders of Florida's SunPass for the convenience of Canadian travelers en route to Florida.

Border crossing

The Thousand Islands Border Crossing connects the towns of Alexandria Bay, New York and Ivy Lea, Ontario at the Thousand Islands Bridge.

It is the westernmost of the three St. Lawrence River crossings, and is very busy, with up to two-hour waits in the summer. The US border station at Alexandria Bay is sometimes called Thousand Islands. The Canada border station of Lansdowne is sometimes called Gananoque, for the nearby town where international ferry service is provided. These border stations are also responsible for inspecting vessel traffic between the countries. The US has seasonal vessel inspection stations on Heart Island and at Cape Vincent, NY, and Canada has seasonal vessel inspection stations at Rockport, Ontario and Gananoque, Ontario. Both Canada Border Services Agency (CBSA) and the U.S. Customs and Border Protection (CBP) travel to selected ports and marinas on request for inspections.

History

The entire Thousand Islands Bridge system took sixteen months to build. Completed ten weeks ahead of schedule, its total cost was $3.05 million (equivalent to $ million in  dollars).

Shortly after opening, the bridge displayed aerodynamic oscillation problems that were quickly corrected via structural upgrades.

In its early years of its operation, around 150,000 vehicles crossed the bridge annually. Today, annual crossings exceed 2,000,000 vehicles.

Gallery

See also
List of bridges in Canada
List of crossings of the Saint Lawrence River and the Great Lakes
Boldt Castle (landmark owned by the Thousand Islands Bridge Authority)
Dewolf Point State Park
Sewells Road Bridge
Ogdensburg–Prescott International Bridge
Ambassador Bridge
Buffalo and Fort Erie Public Bridge Authority

References

External links
Thousand Islands Bridge Authority 
Aerial photos of the Thousand Island Bridge System
Ian Coristine's Thousand Islands Canadian Span & Area Gallery
Tim Kocher's Riverview Photography of Ships Navigating Under the American Span & Gallery
 CBC Digital Archives: Recording of Franklin Delano Roosevelt's address at the opening of the Thousand Islands Bridge

Suspension bridges in New York (state)
Suspension bridges in Canada
Road bridges in Ontario
Bridges completed in 1937
Canada–United States bridges
Interstate 81
Bridges on the Interstate Highway System
Buildings and structures in Leeds and Grenville United Counties
Thousand Islands
Bridges over the Saint Lawrence River
Road bridges in New York (state)
Transport in Leeds and Grenville United Counties
Tolled sections of Interstate Highways
Toll bridges in New York (state)
Toll bridges in Canada
Open-spandrel deck arch bridges in the United States
Open-spandrel deck arch bridges
Truss bridges in the United States
Truss bridges in Canada